Coursera Inc. is a U.S.-based massive open online course provider founded in 2012 by Stanford University computer science professors Andrew Ng and Daphne Koller. Coursera works with universities and other organizations to offer online courses, certifications, and degrees in a variety of subjects. In 2021 it was estimated that about 150 universities offered more than 4,000 courses through Coursera.

History
Coursera was founded in 2012 by Stanford University computer science professors Andrew Ng and Daphne Koller. Ng and Koller started offering their Stanford courses online in fall 2011, and soon after left Stanford to launch Coursera. Princeton, Stanford, the University of Michigan, and the University of Pennsylvania were the first universities to offer content on the platform.

In 2014 Coursera received both the Webby Winner (Websites and Mobile Sites
Education 2014) and the People's Voice Winner (Websites and Mobile Sites Education) awards.

Finances
Coursera's revenues rose from $184 million in 2019 to $294 million in 2020. To date, Coursera has not made a profit. The company lost $66 million in 2020 as it ramped up marketing and advertising.

For the first quarter of 2021, Coursera reported revenue of $88.4 million, up 64% from a year earlier, with a net loss of $18.7 million, or $13.4 million on a non-GAAP basis. Coursera said consumer revenue was $51.9 million, up 61%, while enterprise revenue was $24.5 million, up 63%, and degree programs had revenue of $12 million, up 81%.

For the third quarter of 2021, Coursera reported revenue of $109.9 million, up 33% from $82.7 million a year ago. Gross profit was $67.7 million or 61.6% of revenue. Net loss was $(32.5) million or (29.5)% of revenue.

Funding
The startup raised an initial $16 million funding round backed by Kleiner Perkins Caufield & Byers and New Enterprise Associates. In 2013, GSV led the Series B investment, which totaled $63 million. In 2015, NEA led the Series C round of venture funding, which totaled more than $60 million. In 2017, the company raised $64 million from its existing investors in a Series D round of funding. In 2019, the company raised $103 million in Series E round of funding from the SEEK Group, Future Fund and NEA. The company reached valuation of $1 billion+ in 2019. In July 2020, the company announced it had raised $130 million in Series F funding and updated its valuation to $2.5 billion.

Business model
In September 2013, it announced it had earned $1 million in revenue through the sale of verified certificates that authenticate successful course completion. Coursera first rolled out a series of fee-based course options, which included verified credentials for completion, in 2013. As of October 2015, the company had raised a total of $146.1 million in venture capital.

In January 2016, Coursera rolled out fees to earn grades and assessments for "the vast majority of courses that are part of Specializations". The company offers Financial Aid to people who demonstrate a need.
In July 2016, the company launched an enterprise product called Coursera for Business. TechCrunch notes that the company "opened itself to additional revenues from the lucrative corporate e-learning market, which some reports suggest was worth $12 billion in the US alone". Coursera for Business customers include L'Oréal, Boston Consulting Group, and Axis Bank. In October 2016, Coursera launched a monthly subscription model for Specializations and a 1-week free trial. The company has said subscription costs will vary "depending on the topic area".

In January 2017, the company launched Coursera for Governments & Nonprofits. Coursera has announced partnerships with the Institute for Veterans & Military Families (IVMF) in the United States and entities in Egypt, Mongolia, Singapore, Malaysia, Pakistan, and Kazakhstan. In June 2017, Jeff Maggioncalda became the CEO of Coursera.

In March 2018, Coursera launched six fully online degree courses, including the bachelor's and master's qualifications in various domains.

In March 2021, Coursera filed for an IPO. The nine-year-old company brought in roughly $293 million in revenue for the fiscal year ended December 31 — a 59% growth rate from 2019, according to the filing. Net losses widened by roughly $20 million yearly, reaching $66.8 million in 2020. Coursera spent $107 million on marketing in 2020.

Strategic partners
 the total number of partners is more than 200 across 29 countries. Coursera mainly works with universities and colleges, but also with corporations and governments. University partners include University of São Paulo in Brazil, University of London in the UK, Indian School of Business of India, Yonsei University in South Korea, and institutions like Yale, University of Illinois and University of Pennsylvania. Google launched Professional certification program. Google will consider all of its certificates as the equivalent of a four-year college degree.

Product and services

Courses 
Coursera courses last approximately four to twelve weeks, with one to two hours of video lectures a week. These courses provide quizzes, weekly exercises, peer-graded and reviewed assignments, an optional Honors assignment, and sometimes a final project or exam to complete the course. Courses are also provided on-demand, in which case users can take their time in completing the course with all of the material available at once. , Coursera offered 104 on-demand courses. They also provide guided projects which are short 2-3 hour projects that can be done at home.

According to 'Coursera Impact Report 2020', the top five most popular courses that people learn from Coursera were contact tracing, digital marketing, project management, Python programming, and social psychology.

Degrees 
As of 2017, Coursera offers complete master's degrees. They first started with a Master's in Innovation and Entrepreneurship (OMIE) from HEC Paris and a Master's of Accounting (iMSA) from the University of Illinois but have moved on to offer a Master of Computer Science in Data Science and Master of Business Administration (iMBA), both from University of Illinois. Also as part of their MBA programs, there are some courses which are offered separately, which are included in the curriculum of specific MBAs when enrolling in classes such as their digital marketing courses.

Professional certificate
Google, IBM, Meta and other well-known companies, launched various courses for professional certificates, allowing students to fill the workforce in various sectors, such as data analytics, IT support, digital marketing, UX design, project management, and Data science. According to Google, their courses are equivalent to 4 year degrees. They also offered 100,000 scholarships. Google and its 20+ partners will accept those certificates as 4-year degree equivalent.

Impact
In 2020, in response to the COVID-19 pandemic, Coursera launched a course by the Jameel Institute at Imperial College London. Called "Science Matters: Let's Talk About COVID-19", the course was the most popular launched on Coursera in 2020, with over 130,000 enrolled learners that year. The course was presented by Jameel Institute research lead Professor Helen Ward and deputy director Dr Katharina Hauck, with specific modules in collaboration with other researchers from across Imperial.

Outreach and sponsorship programs
In March 2020, in response to the global COVID-19 pandemic, Coursera, alongside its partners, sponsored over 115 certification courses for people who may have been affected by the global pandemic. This is part of an outreach initiative for people who may have lost their jobs, been retrenched, had their salaries reduced, or merely want to improve and grow by learning and developing their technical skills through recognized certifications. The program ended on December 31, 2020, but many free courses on Coursera remain available through auditing.

References

External links 
 

American educational websites
Companies listed on the New York Stock Exchange
Companies based in Mountain View, California
Education companies established in 2012
Educational technology companies of the United States
Open educational resources
Software companies based in the San Francisco Bay Area
Software companies of the United States
Software companies established in 2012
American companies established in 2012
2012 establishments in California
2021 initial public offerings